Let's Dance 2020 is the fifteenth season of the Swedish celebrity dancing show Let's Dance. The season premiered on 20 March 2020, and was broadcast on TV4.

Due to the outbreak of the coronavirus pandemic in Sweden, TV4 decided that a number of the season's episodes would be filmed without an audience.
On 17 March, TV4 announced that because of restrictions as a result of the pandemic, actress Siw Malmkvist would not be participating in this season. She was offered a spot in the 2021 season. Because celebrity dancer Anders Jansson was suffering from a cold, the second episode of the show was cancelled; the show will feature live performances from several Swedish singers instead. During the second episode, Dr. Mikael Sandström revealed he would not continue dancing this season. Instead, he will focus on his duties as a doctor during the pandemic. Because of the ongoing illnesses of one dancer and several crew members, the show paused for two weeks, but returned on 17 April. Restrictions meant that Anders Jansson could not take part in the 17 April episode. On 20 April, Jansson announced that he was pulling out of the show because of his illness.

Contestants
Swedish politician Jan Björklund was announced as the season's first celebrity in February 2020.

Scoring chart

Red numbers indicate the lowest score of each week.
Green numbers indicate the highest score of each week.
 indicates the couple that was eliminated that week.
 indicates the couple received the lowest score of the week and was eliminated.
 indicates the couple withdrew from the competition.
 indicates the couple finished in the bottom two.
 indicates the couple earned immunity from elimination.
 indicates the winning couple.
 indicates the runner-up couple.
 indicates the third place couple.

Average chart

References 

2020
TV4 (Sweden) original programming
2020 Swedish television seasons
Television series impacted by the COVID-19 pandemic
2020 Swedish television series endings